Lezhebokovo is a rural locality (a selo) in Osinovsky Selsoviet, Birsky District, Bashkortostan, Russia. The population was 22 as of 2010. There are 2 streets.

Geography 
Lezhebokovo is located 24 km southeast of Birsk (the district's administrative centre) by road. Yemashevo is the nearest rural locality.

References 

Rural localities in Birsky District